"Hold On to the Nights" is a power ballad written and performed by American rock singer/songwriter/musician Richard Marx.  This was the fourth and final single released from his self-titled debut album, and his first to reach number one on the US Billboard Hot 100 chart. The song has been re-released on numerous albums and is included on Marx's live performance DVD A Night Out with Friends (2012).

Release
"Hold On to the Nights" reached the Billboard Hot 100 number 1 position on July 23, 1988, preventing Def Leppard's "Pour Some Sugar on Me" from reaching the top spot that same week. The song was on the chart for twenty-one weeks, and left the chart at number 91. The song also reached at number three on the Billboard Adult Contemporary chart.

Chart performance

Charts

Personnel 
 Richard Marx – vocals, keyboards, acoustic piano
 Michael Landau – guitars
 Patrick O'Hearn – bass
 Tris Imboden – drums
 Paulinho da Costa – percussion

Other performances
Marx appeared as lounge singer/piano player Buddy Daquiri in the "Poison Fire Teats Universe" episode of the TV series Life in Pieces in 2017, in which he played the song on the piano while whistling.

References 

1987 songs
1988 singles
Richard Marx songs
Billboard Hot 100 number-one singles
Songs written by Richard Marx
Pop ballads
Rock ballads
EMI Records singles
Songs about nights